Sir Josiah Crosby  (25 May 1880 –  4 December 1958) was a British diplomat. He was British Minister to Panama and Costa Rica from 1931 to 1934 and British Minister to Siam from 1934 to 1941.

Born in Falmouth, the son of a master mariner, Crosby was educated at the Royal Grammar School, Newcastle Upon Tyne and Gonville and Caius College, Cambridge, where he was a scholar and took first-class honours in the modern languages tripos in 1902. He joined the Consular Service in 1904 and served in Siam in various capacities until 1917, when he was appointed consul at Saigon. After serving as acting consul-general at Bangkok in 1919–20, he was consul-general at Saigon in 1920, and consul-general at Batavia from 1921 to 1931.

In 1931, Crosby was appointed British minister to Panama, and in 1934 he returned to Siam as British minister there. He retired in 1941, and was imprisoned in Siam for a time during the Second World War. In 1944, he published Siam: The Crossroads, a book about the country.

Crosby was appointed OBE in 1918, CIE in 1919, KBE in 1928, and KCMG in 1942.

References 

1880 births
1958 deaths
Knights Commander of the Order of St Michael and St George
Ambassadors of the United Kingdom to Costa Rica
Ambassadors of the United Kingdom to Panama
Ambassadors of the United Kingdom to Thailand
Knights Commander of the Order of the British Empire
Companions of the Order of the Indian Empire
British consuls
People educated at the Royal Grammar School, Newcastle upon Tyne
Alumni of Gonville and Caius College, Cambridge